Theodorus Martinus Maria "Theo" Lucius (born 19 December 1976) is a Dutch former professional footballer. He could operate as a right back or a central defender, and also as a defensive midfielder.

He spent most of his 16-year professional career with PSV, winning nine major titles with the club, notably four Eredivisie championships, and appearing in 254 games in the competition overall (17 goals).

Club career

Den Bosch
Lucius was born in Veghel, North Brabant. When he was five years old he started his football career at amateurs VV Heeswijk, joining BVV Den Bosch eight years later and being reconverted from a striker to a midfielder; since the age of 15, he also worked as a carpenter, and made formwork for a concrete factory.

In the 1996–97 season, newly appointed manager Kees Zwamborn awarded Lucius with his senior official debut, an Eerste Divisie match away against BV Veendam on 20 August 1996 (0–1 loss), and the player was an undisputed starter in his two years with the 's-Hertogenbosch side, as it consecutively fell short in the promotion playoffs.

PSV
In the 1998 off-season, after reported interest from FC Utrecht, AZ and PSV Eindhoven, Lucius chose the latter, managed by Bobby Robson. He played 25 games in his first season, winning the Dutch Supercup.

When Erik Gerets took over from the English, Lucius was sent on loan to Utrecht, returning to the Philips side for the 2000–01 campaign and continuing to be regularly used under both the Belgian and his successor, Guus Hiddink, as the club won four Eredivisie championships, also reaching the semifinals in the 2004–05 edition of the UEFA Champions League, being eliminated by A.C. Milan in the dying seconds of the game (3–1 home win, after a 0–2 loss in the first leg); in his last two years, the player was used more as a right back.

Feyenoord and later years
Lucius moved to Feyenoord for 2006–07, scoring a career-best five goals in 27 games as the De Kuip side finished in seventh position. He won the following season's domestic cup, against Roda JC (2–0).

Following the return of Giovanni van Bronckhorst, Lucius was stripped of his captain armband. In June 2009, his contract with the Rotterdam club ended, and Lucius spent the following months training with former club Den Bosch in view of a permanent move, supposedly with an amateur contract; eventually, nothing came of it and he joined FC Groningen for one season.

In July 2010, aged nearly 34, Lucius finally returned to Den Bosch, again in the second division. At the end of the campaign, he moved to another team in the category, FC Eindhoven. After one year he joined RKC Waalwijk on an amateur basis, but left after only one month due to lack of playing time, rejoining his previous club in the following transfer window.

International career
On 4 June 2005, Lucius made his debut with the Netherlands, led by Marco van Basten, in a 2–0 home win against Romania for the 2006 FIFA World Cup qualifiers. Four days later, in the same competition – again as a starting right back – he won the second of his three caps, in a 4–0 win over Finland.

Personal life
In January 2004, Lucius made headlines for selling illegal fireworks to a man from Breda in December of the previous year. When using the device, the man was badly injured and lost his eye. As a result, Lucius spent a few days in jail and was sentenced to community service, first to 80 hours, which was raised in 2006 to 240 hours.

He was also a poker player, with a rather negative record.

After his active career, Lucius became co-owner of a café in his home town of Heeswijk-Dinther.

Career statistics

Honours
PSV
Eredivisie: 2000–01, 2002–03, 2004–05, 2005–06
KNVB Cup: 2004–05; Runner-up 2000–01, 2005–06
Johan Cruijff Shield: 1998, 2000, 2001, 2003; Runner-up 2002, 2005

Feyenoord
KNVB Cup: 2007–08
Johan Cruijff Shield: Runner-up 2008

References

External links
Stats at Voetbal International 

1976 births
Living people
People from Veghel
Dutch footballers
Association football defenders
Association football midfielders
Association football utility players
Netherlands international footballers
Eredivisie players
Eerste Divisie players
Derde Divisie players
FC Den Bosch players
PSV Eindhoven players
FC Utrecht players
Feyenoord players
FC Groningen players
FC Eindhoven players
RKC Waalwijk players
Kozakken Boys players
Footballers from North Brabant